Arthur Wilkinson (28 December 1872 – unknown) was an English first-class cricketer active 1894–95 who played for Nottinghamshire. He was born in Nottingham.

References

1872 births
Date of death unknown
English cricketers
Nottinghamshire cricketers